Croesyceiliog Rugby Football Club is a Welsh rugby union team based in Croesyceiliog. Today, Croesyceiliog RFC plays in the Welsh Rugby Union Division One East league and are a feeder club for Newport Gwent Dragons.

History
Croesyceiliog RFC was founded in 1881 and the first known Club Captain was one G. Morgan who led the side in the 1883/84 season. The side are known locally as the Cockerels, and a Cockerel is depicted on the club's crest. The club has played at several locations during their long history including at one point in a farm-field owned by Jack Walker, a former player, chairman and president of the club. Since the 1960s Torfaen Borough Council have allowed Croesyceiliog RFC to use the facilities at Woodland Road.

During 1975, under the chairmanship of Mr Jack Walker, the Rugby Club amalgamated with Croesyceiliog Cricket Club, and established headquarters at the cricket ground. In 1976, the club applied for, and was granted membership of the Welsh Rugby Union.

Club honours
1998/99 - WRU Division Five East Champions
2000/01 - WRU Division Four East Champions
2015/16 - Ben Francis Cup Winners
2016/17 - WRU Division Two East Champions
2014/15 - World Record Longest Drop Goal - Luke Brown

Notable former players

  Clive Burgess (9 caps)
  Lewk Loder (99 caps)

References

Rugby clubs established in 1881
Welsh rugby union teams
1881 establishments in Wales